Long drop may refer to:

 Hanging#Long drop, a method of execution by hanging
 Long drop, a synonym for pit latrine